William Hussey (c.1724 – 26 January 1813) was an English businessman and politician who sat in the House of Commons for 48 years from 1765 to 1813.

Early life
Hussey was baptised on 1 January 1725, the son of John Hussey, Mayor of Salisbury in 1737. On his father's death in 1739 he inherited property in Wiltshire and Dorset and became a successful clothier in Salisbury. He married firstly Mary Eyre, the daughter of John Eyre of Landford Lodge, Wiltshire, on 9 October 1752. She died on 21 May 1754. In 1755 he was elected a councillor for the city of Salisbury, becoming an alderman in 1756 and mayor in 1759. He married secondly Jane Marsh, daughter of Robert Marsh, a London merchant and Governor of the Bank of England on 5 April 1758.

Political career
Hussey was returned as Member of Parliament (MP) for St Germans at a by-election on 11 June 1765. At the 1768 general election he was returned as MP for Hindon. He was elected for Salisbury in the 1774 general election and held the seat to his death. In 1784 he was a member of the St. Alban's Tavern group which tried to bring Fox and Pitt together.

Hussey died on 26 January 1813. He had a daughter by his first wife Mary. By his second wife Jane, he had a son and a daughter Mary who married William Drake (junior), MP. In his will he divided most of his property between his great-nephews Ambrose Hussey of Salisbury and John Hussey (1789-1849) of Salisbury and Lyme Regis.

References

1725 births
1813 deaths
Mayors of Salisbury
Members of the Parliament of Great Britain for English constituencies
Members of the Parliament of Great Britain for constituencies in Cornwall
British MPs 1761–1768
British MPs 1768–1774
British MPs 1774–1780
British MPs 1780–1784
British MPs 1784–1790
British MPs 1790–1796
British MPs 1796–1800
Members of the Parliament of the United Kingdom for English constituencies
UK MPs 1801–1802
UK MPs 1802–1806
UK MPs 1806–1807
UK MPs 1807–1812
UK MPs 1812–1818